Armenian Airlines was an Armenian airline company and the state-owned flag carrier of Armenia.

History 
Armenian Airlines was established shortly after independence in 1991 from Aeroflot's Armenia directorate, and was the sole carrier in Armenia until 2002, when private companies Armenian International Airways and Armavia began to compete with it.

Profitable until 1997, Armenian Airlines began a decline in 1998 which executive director Arsen Avetisian blamed on the 1998 Russian financial crisis. Additionally, technical problems with its sole Airbus A310 helped lead the company towards financial problems.  The company began to join forces with Belgian operator VG Airlines (later renamed Delsey Airlines); but the Belgian carrier had to file for bankruptcy on November 5, 2002. Armenian Airlines was reported to be looking for cooperation with Armenian International Airways to continue or restart its flights into Europe. When Armavia (which was owned by Siberia Airlines) entered into an agreement with the Armenian government and was granted most of Armenian Airlines' flight rights, including the lucrative Yerevan to Moscow route, Armenian Airlines was unable to recover, and officially declared bankruptcy on April 15, 2003.

On May 3, 2006, it was widely reported that an Armenian Airlines Airbus A320 had crashed in the Black Sea. The reports were evidently mistaken, since the airline had ceased operations in 2004. In fact, the airline involved in the crash was Armavia, the successor of Armenian Airlines. All 113 passengers and crew on board died.

Routes 

 
After being established, Armenian Airlines operated old Antonov An-12, Tupolev Tu-134, Tupolev Tu-154, Ilyushin Il-86, Yakovlev Yak-42 airplanes from the Soviet era. But following tightening of environmental regulations, these Ukrainian and Russian-built planes were banned from landing in European airports because they did not meet emissions and noise standards. Because of this, Armenian Airlines began leasing an Airbus A310 in 1998, with an option to buy. The contract stirred controversy among those who questioned why the Government airline was, for the first time, using a non-Russian-built aircraft. But some foreign agencies doing business in Armenia said they could not get life insurance for employees who flew on old Russian planes due to the aircraft history of problems. The Airbus, then, became the European link for the "official airline of Armenia".Armenian Airlines faced disruption on its European operations following an engine failure on its sole Airbus A310 on January 21, 2002, which caused a Yerevan-Paris flight to turn around mid-air and return to Zvartnots International Airport where the crippled Airbus landed safely (previously, on September 14, 2001, and after taking off towards Paris CDG had the same engine failure returning to Zvartnots where all the emergency means had been activated, after four hours of waiting the flight to Paris was authorized to take place with the IL -86). On January 28 of the same year, representatives of Armenian Airlines visited London to discuss means for getting the Airbus repaired. According to directors of the company, the repair bill could have gone as high as $2 million, the quickest solution being to replace the damaged engine. Otherwise, the engine would have to be sent either to Brussels, Belgium, or Toulouse, France, for repairs. The A310 was the only aircraft in the Armenian Airlines fleet that met European aviation regulations. It flew every day on routes to Paris, Amsterdam or Frankfurt.

Fleet
At the time Armenian Airlines ceased its operations, they only operated one Airbus A310 aircraft, often used for travel to European destinations.

Additionally, their other aircraft included:

 Ilyushin Il-86
 Antonov An-12
 Tupolev Tu-134
 Yakovlev Yak-42
 Antonov An-24

However, due to strict European Union regulations, all of their Soviet-era aircraft were barred from flying to and from Europe.

References

External links
 Armenian Airlines (Archive)

Defunct airlines of Armenia
Airlines established in 1991
Airlines disestablished in 2003
2003 disestablishments in Armenia
Armenian companies established in 1991